The National Herbarium is an herbarium, located in Islamabad, Pakistan.

History and collection
The largest herbarium in Pakistan, it was established in 1975 with Dr. Ralph Randles Stewart's collection as its initial beginning. It has a collection of over 100,000 plants. The plants in the herbarium are divided into magnoliophytes (dicotyledons and monocotyledons), gymnosperms, and pteridophytes (or ferns) and they are placed according to families, genera; and species arranged in alphabetical order.

See also
 List of botanical gardens in Pakistan
 List of herbaria

  Pakistani biodiversity

1975 establishments in Pakistan
Botanical gardens in Pakistan
Pakistan
Islamabad
Organizations established in 1975